A toilet is a sanitation fixture used primarily for the disposal of human excrement and urine.

Toilet may also refer to:
Toilet (room), a room that contains a toilet and sometimes a sink

See also
Personal grooming, also known as "performing one's toilette"
Toilet service a luxurious set of boxes, brushes and the like for use at the dressing-table
Toilet water, a sort of perfume
Toiletries, consumable items of personal grooming, e.g. shampoo
Toilet table, a name for the dressing table
Wound toilet, the practice of cleansing a wound before applying a dressing
Toileting, the act of assisting a dependent patient with his or her elimination needs
Toilet circuit, a network of small music venues in the UK which are frequently played by rising bands before they achieve mainstream fame
Toilet (film), a 2010 Japanese film
Toilet: Ek Prem Katha (Toilet: A Love Story), a 2017 Indian film